is a volcanic, deserted island located in the Philippine Sea approximately  south of Tokyo and  southwest of Mikura-jima, in the center of the Izu archipelago, Japan.

Geography
The island is an andesite pillar with sheer sides, the only visible portion of a submarine volcanic caldera. Located in the Kuroshio Current, the area has abundant sea life, and is popular with sports fishermen and scuba divers.

See also

 Izu Islands
 Desert island
 List of islands

External links
Quaternary Volcanoes in Japan

Izu Islands
Uninhabited islands of Japan
Extinct volcanoes
Stacks of Japan
Islands of Tokyo
Pleistocene lava domes